James W. Toban (November 23, 1845 - November 2, 1903) was an American sergeant awarded the Medal of Honor for actions at Aiken, South Carolina during the American Civil War. The medal was awarded for actions on 11 February, 1865 with the 9th Michigan Cavalry. He was born in Northfield, Michigan and died in Lansing, Michigan.

Medal of Honor Citation 
Voluntarily and at great personal risk returned, in the face of the advance of the enemy, and rescued from impending death or capture, Major William C. Stevens, 9th Michigan Cavalry, who had been thrown from his horse.

Date Issued: 9 July, 1896

References 

1845 births
1903 deaths
19th-century American military personnel